Volgodonsk is a city in Rostov Oblast, Russia, located in the east of the oblast on the west bank of the Tsimlyansk Reservoir. Population:    28,000 (1970).

History

Volgodonsk was founded in 1950 as a small settlement for the Tsimlyansk hydroelectric dam maintenance personnel. It grew in size due to the construction of the Volga–Don Canal. 

On September 16, 1999 a powerful truck bomb exploded outside an apartment building, killing 17 people and injuring a further 69. It was the fifth explosion in a series of apartment bombings in Russia that killed more than 300 people.

Administrative and municipal status
Within the framework of administrative divisions, it is incorporated as Volgodonsk Urban Okrug—an administrative unit with the status equal to that of the districts. As a municipal division, this administrative unit also has urban okrug status.

Economy

Volgodonsk is one of the economic leaders of Rostov Oblast. The economy of the city is centered around the nuclear industry. It is home to the Atommash factory, which manufactures nuclear reactors and related heavy machinery. The plant mainly builds Rosatom's VVER type pressurized water reactors both for domestic use and export. Four such reactors (VVER-1000 model) generated about 26 600 GWh of electricity at the  Rostov nuclear power plant, located just 18 km from the city center. Atommash, the power plant, along with the two thermal power stations, are the city's main employers.

Transportation

The city is a regional transport hub on the Volga–Don Canal.  A railway and M4 highway pass nearby. Bus routes were launched in 1954. There are presently thirty bus routes. Trolleybuses have been running since 1977. There are currently six trolleybus routes in the city.  Volgodonsk port has a strategic importance as access to major ports of different countries.

Culture
Volgodonsk is one of the major cultural centers of Rostov Oblast. There are six art schools, two museums, seventeen historical and cultural sites, and three buildings recognized as architectural monuments of regional importance. The Cathedral of the Nativity is also situated in Volgodonsk.

Notable people 
 Oleh Drozdov (born 1966), Ukrainian architect, artist, and teacher
 Vitali Kazantsev (born 1981), Russian football coach and former player
 Aleksei Germashov (born 1982), Russian professional football player
 Aleksandr Omelchenko (born 1983), Russian professional footballer
 Olga Beliaeva (born 1985), Russian water polo player
 Nikita Borisoglebsky (born 1985), Russian violinist
 Dmitry Kudryashov (born 1985), Russian professional boxer and the current WBA International cruiserweight champion
 Anna Grineva (born 1988), Russian water polo player
 Anna Ustyukhina (born 1989), Russian water polo goalkeeper
 Ekaterina Prokofyeva (born 1991), Russian water polo player
 Yuliya Yefimova (born 1992), Russian swimmer
 Pavel Filatyev (born 1988), former soldier in Russia's invasion of Ukraine

Twin towns 

  Tamási

References

Notes

Sources

Cities and towns in Rostov Oblast
Cities and towns built in the Soviet Union
Populated places established in 1950
1950 establishments in Russia